Guy Nosbaum (10 May 1930 – 12 August 1996) was a French rower who competed in the 1952 Summer Olympics and in the 1960 Summer Olympics. He was Jewish, and was born in Corbeil. In 1952 he was a crew member of the French boat which was eliminated in the semi-finals of the coxed four event. Eight years later he won the silver medal with the French boat in the coxed fours competition.

References

1930 births
1996 deaths
French male rowers
Olympic rowers of France
Rowers at the 1952 Summer Olympics
Rowers at the 1960 Summer Olympics
Olympic silver medalists for France
Olympic medalists in rowing
20th-century French Jews
Jewish sportspeople
Medalists at the 1960 Summer Olympics
European Rowing Championships medalists
Sportspeople from Marne (department)
20th-century French people